Kim Taek-hyeong (Hangul: 김택형) (born October 10, 1996 in Incheon) is a South Korean pitcher for the SSG Landers in the Korea Baseball Organization. He previously played in KBO for the Nexen Heroes.

References 

SSG Landers players
Kiwoom Heroes players
KBO League pitchers
South Korean baseball players
1996 births
Living people
Sportspeople from Incheon